Make Me may refer to:

 "Make Me..." (Britney Spears song), 2016
 "Make Me" (Janet Jackson song), 2009
 "Make Me (Cry)", by Noah Cyrus
 Make Me (novel), 2015 Jack Reacher novel by Lee Child